Frank Noble (born 26 October 1945) is a former footballer who played as a full back in the Football League during the 1960s and 1970s, mainly with Peterborough United. He was born in Sheffield.

He started as a junior with Sheffield Wednesday, although he only made two Football League appearances for them, with his last appearance in 1965/66.

He moved to Peterborough United for 1967-68 and went on to play 226 games for the club. He played for them in their FA Cup 3rd round tie against Portsmouth on 27 January 1968, which was their last FA Cup game prior to their demotion for financial irregularities. He retired from football during the 1971–72 season.

References 

1945 births
Association football defenders
English Football League players
Sheffield Wednesday F.C. players
Peterborough United F.C. players
Living people
English footballers